The Robin DR400 is a wooden sport monoplane, conceived by Pierre Robin and Jean Délémontez. The Robin DR400 first flew in 1972 and is still in production. The current model is designated 'DR401'. It has a tricycle undercarriage and can carry four people. The DR400 has a 'cranked wing' configuration, with the dihedral angle of the outer wing much greater than the inboard, a configuration which they share with Jodel aircraft.

Development
The Robin DR300 series were developments of the earlier DR.221 Dauphin and DR.250 Capitaine with a tricycle landing gear. The first variant was the DR340 Major, a tricycle landing gear version of the DR250 Capitaine which first flew on 27 February 1968, followed on 21 March 1968 by the DR315 Petit Prince, a tricycle landing gear version of the DR221 Dauphin. The DR315 was later replaced by the DR300. In 1972 an improved version, the DR400 was introduced with a forward-sliding canopy.

Design

The fabric covered wing is a derivative of the earlier Jodel designs, with the dihedral of the outer panels providing lateral stability in flight.

There is pronounced washout in the outer panels which have a lower angle of attack than the centre section.  Thus the induced drag they produce decreases in cruise flight more than the induced drag of the centre section. Stall characteristics are benign.

Variants
DR315 Petit Prince
A development of the earlier DR221 with a tricycle landing gear and powered by  a 115hp Lycoming O-235-C2A engine.
DR330
An experimental DR.315 fitted with a 130hp Continental O-240-A engine in 1970.
DR340 Major
A development of the earlier DR250 with a tricycle landing gear and powered by a 140hp Lycoming O-320-E2A engine.
DR360 Chevalier
DR340 with a solid cabin roof and a 160hp Lycoming O-320-D2A engine.
DR300/108 2+2
Replacement for the DR.315 with improved landing gear and either two or four seats.
DR300/120
Four-seat DR.300 with a 120hp Lycoming O-235-L2A engine.
DR300/140
DR300 with a 140hp Lycoming O-235-E2A engine.
DR300/180
DR300 with a 180hp Lycoming O-360-A3A engine.

DR300/180R
Glider tug version of the DR.300-180.
DR400/100 Cadet
Two-seat version of the DR.400-108
DR400/108 Dauphin 80 2+2
DR300/108 with forward-sliding canopy
DR400/120 Petit Prince
DR300/120 with forward-sliding canopy
DR400/120 Dauphin 2+2
Petit Prince with extra cabin windows.
DR400/125
DR400/120 with a 125hp Lycoming O-235-F engine
DR400/140 Earl
DR300/140 with forward-sliding canopy
DR400/140B Major 80
DR400/140 with a 160hp Lycoming O-320-D2A
DR400/160 Chevalier
Original designation for the DR400-140B
DR400/180 Regent
DR300/180 with forward-sliding canopy, later models have extra cabin windows.
DR.400/180 Regent III
A Nouvelle Generation DR400
DR400/180R Remorqueur
DR400/180 glider tug with clear canopy
DR400/180RP Remo 212
DR400/180R fitted with a 212hp Porsche PFM 3200 engine and 3-bladed propeller
DR401
Supplied by the resurrected Robin Aircraft. Glass cockpit, larger cockpit, electric trim and flaps, range of engine options, variants for "long range" and "aerotow".

Operators

French Air Force

Specifications (DR400/180 Régent)

References 

Exavia Ltd (Exeter, United Kingdom)- article "A DR400 Buyers' Guide"
 The Illustrated Encyclopedia of Aircraft (Part Work 1982-1985), 1985, Orbis Publishing, Page 2799
 R.W.Simpson, Airlife's General Aviation, Airlife Publishing, England, 1991, 
 

DR400
Low-wing aircraft
Glider tugs
1970s French civil utility aircraft
Single-engined tractor aircraft
Aircraft first flown in 1972